Andrei Aleksandrovich Bashko (born  23 May 1982 in Minsk, Belarusian SSR) is a Belarusian professional former ice hockey defenceman. Bashko began playing professionally in 1998 in the Eastern European Hockey League with Yunost Minsk. He also later played for Keramin Minsk. He had previously played for Metallurg Novokuznetsk and Amur Khabarovsk in the Kontinental Hockey League. Internationally Bashko played for the Belarusian national team at three World Championships.

Career statistics

Regular season and playoffs

International

External links
 

1982 births
Amur Khabarovsk players
Belarusian ice hockey defencemen
Expatriate ice hockey players in Russia
HC Dinamo Minsk players
HC Shakhtyor Soligorsk players
HK Gomel players
HK Kremenchuk players
HK Mogilev players
Keramin Minsk players
Living people
Metallurg Novokuznetsk players
Metallurg Zhlobin players
Ice hockey people from Minsk
Yunost Minsk players